The Riverbank Formation is a geologic formation in California. It preserves fossils.

See also

 List of fossiliferous stratigraphic units in California
 Paleontology in California

References
 

Geology of Sacramento County, California
Geologic formations of California